Dar Biaban (also Romanized as Dar Bīābān and Dar Beyābān) is a village in Kardeh Rural District, in the Central District of Mashhad County, Razavi Khorasan Province, Iran. At the 2006 census, its population was 203, in 51 families.

References 

Populated places in Mashhad County